Arielle Dombasle (born April 27, 1953) is an American-born French singer, actress, director and model. Her breakthrough roles were in Éric Rohmer's Pauline at the Beach (1983) and Alain Robbe-Grillet's The Blue Villa (1995). Appearing in various works by renowned documentary filmmaker Chris Marker, including Sans Soleil (1983), Tokyo Days (1988), and The Owl's Legacy (1989). She also starred in the 1984 miniseries Lace and its 1985 sequel Lace II and appeared as a guest in Miami Vice. Since 1978 she has released twenty-one singles and ten albums and has directed four movies.

Early years
She was born Arielle Laure Maxime Sonnery in Hartford, Connecticut, the daughter of Jean-Louis Melchior Sonnery de Fromental, a silk manufacturer, and Françoise Garreau-Dombasle. She descends from French-American immigrants in Mexico under her grandfather's diplomatic tenure. The family's surname was created in 1912, when Dombasle's grandfather René Sonnery (1887–1925), an industrialist from Lyon, married Anne-Marie Berthon du Fromental. Arielle took the pseudonym Arielle Dombasle in memory of her mother who died at the age of 36. She was raised as a Roman Catholic.

Dombasle and her brother Gilbert were raised in Mexico by their maternal grandparents after their mother's death in 1964. She attended the Lycée Franco-Mexicain. She was also raised at Château de Chaintré, the Sonnery family estate near Mâcon, Saône-et-Loire. Her maternal grandfather, Maurice Garreau-Dombasle, was a close friend of and advisor to Charles de Gaulle, long time commercial attaché for the French Enbassy, who resigned from his post on Sep 3, 1940 that he would "never work 'under German control'," and on June that year was one of the founders of France Forever, had later served as the French ambassador to Mexico. Her maternal grandmother was Man'ha Garreau-Dombasle (née Germaine Massenet, 1898–1999), a writer and poet who translated Rabindranath Tagore's works into French and was a longtime friend of the science fiction writer Ray Bradbury, who dedicated his 1972 novel The Halloween Tree to her.

Career
Dombasle embarked on a career as an actress and singer after attending the Conservatoire International de Musique de Paris and further studies in Mexico. Dombasle has appeared in several Hollywood productions, but most of her acting work has been in French, unlike her albums which are mostly in Spanish and English. She directed four films, Les Pyramides Bleues, Chassé-croisé, Opium and Alien Crystal Palace. She once described her own looks as "a Crazy Horse dancing girl".

In 2006, she released both albums Amor Amor and C'est si Bon in the USA. In September 2006, she also performed three nights in a row at the Supper Club in New York City in front of Michael Douglas, John Malkovich, Lauren Bacall, Salman Rushdie, Andrée Putman and Charlie Rose. The latter invited Arielle Dombasle to promote her albums on The Charlie Rose Show.

Arielle Dombasle then released several albums in France; Glamour à Mort!, Diva Latina, Arielle Dombasle by ERA and La Rivière Atlantique with French rocker Nicolas Ker.

Dombasle joined Les Grosses Têtes, a French radio programme, in January 2016.

That same year, Arielle Dombasle released her fragrance, Le Secret d'Arielle, within Mauboussin. The promotional campaign was created by the French artist Leonardo Marcos.

Dombasle is the first contestant who was confirmed for the eighth season of Danse avec les Stars (the French version of Dancing with the Stars).

In 2018, along with Mareva Galanter, Inna Modja and Helena Noguerra, Arielle Dombasle recreated the French band Les Parisiennes.

Two years later, in 2020, Arielle Dombasle announced she would be releasing a second joint album with Nicolas Ker, named Empire. The album was supposed to be released on April 24, 2020, but was postponed to June 16, 2020, due to the COVID-19 pandemic.

Danse avec les stars

In 2017, she participated in the eighth season of Danse avec les stars – the French version of Dancing with the Stars. She was partnered with professional dancer Maxime Dereymez. On November 2, 2017, they were eliminated finishing 8th out of 10 contestants.

In week 3, each couple have a challenge and the most successful one have 10 points bonus, Arielle & Maxime got the 10 bonus points.

In week 4, each couple was coached by one of the judge, the judge who coached didn't note the couple.

Personal life
Dombasle is the third wife of writer Bernard-Henri Lévy. They married on June 19, 1993, at Saint-Paul-de-Vence on the Côte d'Azur where they have a villa. She has two stepchildren, Antonin-Balthazar Lévy and Justine Lévy, a novelist. She was previously married to Dr. Paul Albou, described by Vanity Fair as a "playboy society dentist, 32 years her senior."

In 2009, she signed a petition in support of Roman Polanski, calling for his release after Polanski was arrested in Switzerland in relation to his 1977 charge for drugging and raping a 13-year-old girl.

Dombasle is vegetarian. In 2016, she campaigned against abattoirs (slaughterhouses) for PETA.

Theater

Filmography

Actress

Director

Discography

Singles
 "Paris m'a séduit" (1980)
 "Cantate 78" (1985)
 "Je te salue mari" (1986)
 "Nada más" (1988)
 "Amour symphonique" (1989)
 "Liberta" (2000)
 "Odysseus" (2000)
 "Rhum and Coca-Cola" (2004)
 "C'est si bon" (2006)
 "Où tu Veux" (2007)
 "Extraterrestre" (2009)
 "Hasta siempre" (2010)
 "Porque te vas" (2011)
 "Mambo 5" (2011)
 "Ave Maria" (2013)
 "Cold Song" (2013)
 "My Love for Evermore" (2015)
 "I'm Not Here Anymore" (2016)
 "Carthagena" (2016)
 "Point Blank" (2016)
 "Ah c'qu'on est bête" (2018)
 "Il fait trop beau pour travailler" (2018)
 "Le chant des sirènes (We Bleed for the Ocean)" (2020)
 "Just Come Back Alive" (2020)
 "Le Grand Hotél" (2020)
 "Humble Guy" (2020)
 "Twin Kingdom Valley" (2020)
 "The Palace Of Virgin Queen" (2020)
 "Desdemona" (2020)

Albums
 2000: Liberta
 2002: Extase
 2004: Amor Amor
 2006: C'est Si Bon
 2009: Glamour à Mort !
 2011: Diva Latina
 2013: Arielle Dombasle By Era
 2015: French Kiss (with The Hillbilly Moon Explosion)
 2016: La Rivière Atlantique (with Nicolas Ker)
 2018: Les Parisiennes (with Mareva Galanter, Inna Modja & Helena Noguerra)
 2020: Empire (with Nicolas Ker)

Notes

References

External links

  (French)
 
 
 Movies at Canal+ (French)

Living people
1953 births
Actresses from Hartford, Connecticut
American people of French descent
American women singers
French women singers
American women radio presenters
American emigrants to France
Spanish-language singers of the United States
American film actresses
French film actresses
French radio presenters
French women radio presenters
French Roman Catholics
French vedettes
Wrasse Records artists